The 2019 Pan American Games Qualifier is a baseball tournament that was held between January 29 and February 3, 2019 in Ibiúna and São Paulo, Brazil. The tournament qualified the last four teams to the Baseball at the 2019 Pan American Games tournament in Lima, Peru.

Four teams qualified for the 2019 Pan American Games: Canada, Colombia, Dominican Republic and Nicaragua.

Qualification
Canada and the USA qualified automatically along with the hosts Brazil, and five teams not qualifying for the 2019 Pan American Games, from the Baseball at the 2018 Central American and Caribbean Games also qualifying. The United States withdrew, meaning the Dominican Republic as the next best ranked team from the Central American and Caribbean Games replaced them. It was announced on 21 January 2019, that the Venezuelan team withdrew due to financial concerns. The team will not be replaced.

Venues
Two venues were used, one each in Ibiúna and São Paulo.

Rosters

Group stage

Group A

Matches held on 1 February were moved to that day after the Dominican Republic had travel difficulties and the other game was washed out.

Group B

Knockout round

Semifinals

Bronze-medal match

Gold-medal match

Final standings

References

External link
Official website 

2019 in baseball
2019 in Brazilian sport
January 2019 sports events in South America
February 2019 sports events in South America
Qualification tournaments for the 2019 Pan American Games
International baseball competitions hosted by Brazil